Bolivia is a landlocked country located in western-central South America. The capitals of Bolivia are La Paz and Sucre. As of 2022, the population of Bolivia is estimated to be around 12 million, with the major ethnic group being Mestizo
. The largest city in Bolivia is Santa Cruz de la Sierra.

Notable firms 
This list includes notable companies with primary headquarters located in the country. The industry and sector follow the Industry Classification Benchmark taxonomy. Organizations that have ceased operations are included and noted as defunct.

References 

Bolivia
Lists of companies of Bolivia